Dr Robert Kerr FRSE FAS FRCSE (20 October 1757 – 11 October 1813) was a Scottish surgeon, writer on scientific and other subjects, and translator.

Life
Kerr was born in 1757 in Bughtridge, Roxburghshire, the son of James Kerr, a jeweller, who served as MP for Edinburgh 1747–1754, and his wife Elizabeth. He was sent to the High School in Edinburgh.

He studied medicine at the University of Edinburgh and practised at the Edinburgh Foundling Hospital as a surgeon. He was elected a Fellow of the Royal Society of Edinburgh in 1788. His proposers were Alexander Fraser Tytler, James Russell and Andrew Dalzell. At this time he lived at Foresters Wynd off the Royal Mile in Edinburgh.

He translated several scientific works into English, such as Antoine Lavoisier's work of 1789, Traité Élémentaire de Chimie, published under the title Elements of Chemistry in a New Systematic Order containing All the Modern Discoveries, in 1790. In 1792, he published The Animal Kingdom, the first two volumes of a four-tome translation of Linnaeus' Systema Naturae, which is often cited as the taxonomic authority for a great many species. (He never translated the remaining two volumes.)

In 1794 he left his post as a surgeon to manage a paper mill at Ayton in Berwickshire which he had purchased. He lost much of his fortune with this enterprise. Out of economical necessity he began writing again in 1809, publishing a variety of minor works, for instance a General View of the Agriculture of Berwickshire. His last work was a translation of Cuvier's Recherches sur les ossements fossiles de quadrupedes, which was published after Kerr's death under the title "Essays on the Theory of the Earth".

His other works included a massive historical study entitled A General History and Collection of Voyages and Travels in eighteen volumes.  Kerr began the series in 1811, dedicating it to Sir Alexander Cochrane, K.B., Vice-Admiral of the White.  Publication did not cease following Kerr's death in 1813; the latter volumes were published into the 1820s.

He died at home, Hope Park House, east of the Meadows in Edinburgh, where he had lived since 1810, and is buried in Greyfriars Kirkyard in central Edinburgh against the eastern wall. His stone is added to a much earlier (1610) ornate stone monument. His son, David Wardrobe Kerr (1796–1815) lies with him.

Selected writings
 
 Volume 01
 Volume 02
 Volume 03
 Volume 04
 Volume 05
 Volume 06
 Volume 07
 Volume 08
 Volume 09
 Volume 10
 Volume 11
 Volume 12
 Volume 13
 Volume 14
 Volume 15
 Volume 16
 Volume 17
 Volume 18

See also
 :Category:Taxa named by Robert Kerr (writer)

Notes

References

Further reading 
 - The introduction by Douglas McKie has information on Robert Kerr, the book's translator.

External links
 
 
 Contemporary review of the "Essays on the Theory of the Earth"
 Significant Scots: Robert Kerr from ElectricScotland.com.

1757 births
1813 deaths
Scottish science writers
Scottish zoologists
Scottish agronomists
19th-century Scottish historians
Scottish surgeons
Scottish translators
Scottish travel writers
Scottish male writers
British mammalogists
Alumni of the University of Edinburgh
Translators from French
People from the Scottish Borders
Burials at Greyfriars Kirkyard
18th-century Scottish scientists
18th-century British zoologists
19th-century British zoologists
18th-century British non-fiction writers
19th-century British non-fiction writers
18th-century Scottish writers
19th-century Scottish writers
19th-century Scottish scientists
18th-century British male writers
19th-century British translators
18th-century British translators